Ian or Iain is a name of Scottish Gaelic origin, derived from the Hebrew given name  (Yohanan) and corresponding to the English name John. The spelling Ian is an Anglicization of the Scottish Gaelic forename Iain. It is a popular name in Scotland, where it originated, as well as other English-speaking countries.

The name has fallen out of the top 100 male baby names in the United Kingdom, having peaked in popularity as one of the top 10 names throughout the 1960s. In 1900, Ian was the 180th most popular male baby name in England and Wales. , the name has been in the top 100 in the United States every year since 1982, peaking at 65 in 2003.

Other Gaelic forms of "John" include "Seonaidh" ("Johnny" from Lowland Scots), "Seon" (from English), "Seathan", and "Seán" and "Eoin" (from Irish). Its Welsh counterpart is Ioan, its Cornish equivalent is Yowan and Breton equivalent is Yann.

Notable people named Ian

As a first name (alphabetical by family name)
Ian Agol (born 1970), American mathematician
Ian Anderson (musician), lead of rock band Jethro Tull
Ian Astbury, singer of rock band The Cult
Ian Bairnson, guitarist of The Alan Parsons Project and Pilot
Ian Baker-Finch, golfer and 1991 British Open winner
Ian Bannen (1928–1999), British actor
Ian Bell, English cricketer
Ian Berry (disambiguation), multiple people
Ian Black (disambiguation), multiple people
Sir Ian Blair, former Head of the Metropolitan Police Service
Ian Bohen (born 1976), American actor
Ian Bolton (born 1953), English footballer
Ian Book (born 1998), American football player
Sir Ian Botham (born 1955), English cricketer
 Ian Brady (Ian Duncan Stewart, 1938–2017), convicted for the Moors murders in England in the 1960s
Ian Bremmer (born 1969), political scientist, author, entrepreneur
Ian Broudie, singer in The Lightning Seeds, and music producer
Ian Brown, singer and lyricist in The Stone Roses
Ian Bunting (born 1996), American football player
Ian Callaghan (born 1942), Liverpool footballer with the most appearances
Ian Callum (born 1954), British design director for Jaguar
Ian Cameron (disambiguation), multiple people
Ian Carmichael (1920–2010), OBE, actor
Ian Carter / iDubbbzTV (born 1990), YouTube personality
Ian Chan (born 1993), Hong Kong singer-songwriter and actor
Ian Chappell (born 1943), former Australian cricketer
Ian Charleson (1949–1990), Scottish/British actor
Ian Clark (disambiguation), multiple people
Ian Clyde (born 1956), Canadian boxer
Ian Cole (born 1989), hockey player
Ian Collier (1943–2008), singer and actor
Ian Cooper (disambiguation), multiple people
Ian Crocker (born 1982), swimmer
Ian Curtis (1956-1980), singer and lyricist in Joy Division
Ian Davidson (disambiguation), multiple people
Ian Davis (disambiguation), multiple people
Ian Desmond (born 1985), Major League Baseball shortstop
Ian Stuart Donaldson, vocalist and frontman of controversial British band Skrewdriver
Ian Dunn (activist) (1943-1998), Scottish gay and paedophile rights activist
Ian Dunn (rugby union) (born 1960), New Zealand rugby union player
Ian Dury (1942–2000), singer and songwriter
Ian Eagle (born 1969), American sports announcer
Ian Edmond (born 1978), swimmer
Ian Falconer (1959–2023), American author and illustrator
Ian Ferguson (disambiguation), multiple people
Ian Flanagan (born 1982), tennis player
Ian Fleming (1908–1964), British novelist, creator of James Bond
Ian Flynn (born 1982), American comic book writer
Ian Frazier (born 1951), writer and humorist
Ian Froman (born 1937), South African-born Israeli tennis player and tennis patron
Ian Gibbons (musician) (1952–2019), English keyboardist, member of The Kinks
Ian Gibson (disambiguation), multiple people
Ian Gillan, lead singer of hard rock band Deep Purple
Ian Gleed DSO DFC, English Royal Air Force flying ace and one of the Few
Ian Gold, former American football player
Ian Gomm (born 1947), British guitarist and singer
Ian Goodfellow (born 1985), Director of Machine Learning in the Special Projects Group at Apple computer
Ian Gow, British Member of Parliament assassinated by IRA terrorists in 1990
Ian Greig, former English cricketer and brother of Tony Greig
Ian Grist (1938–2002), British politician
Ian Hallard (born 1974), British actor
Ian Hamilton (disambiguation), multiple people
Ian Hanomansing, Canadian journalist and news anchor
Ian Harding (born 1986), actor
Ian Hart (born 1964), actor
Ian Haugland (born 1964 as Jan-Håkan Haugland), Norwegian-born Swedish drummer for the band Europe
Ian Healy (born 1964), former Australian Wicket-Keeper
Ian Hecox, comedian with Smosh
Ian Henderson (footballer), current Norwich City F.C. player in the FA Premier League
Ian Henderson (news presenter) (born 1952), Australian news presenter
Ian Henderson (police officer), former head of secret police in Bahrain, accused of torture
Ian Henderson (rugby league), Scottish rugby hooker who plays in Australia
Ian Hennessy (born 1967), Irish soccer player
Ian Hicks (disambiguation), multiple people
Ian Hill, bassist for metal band Judas Priest
Ian Hislop, satirist and editor of Private Eye
Ian Holm (1931–2020), British actor
Ian Ho (swimmer) (born 1997), Hong Kong freestyle swimmer
Ian Hornak (1944–2002), painter
Ian Hunter (actor) (1900–1975), English actor
Ian Hunter (singer), singer of Mott the Hoople
Ian McLellan Hunter (1915-1991), English screenwriter best known as the front for the blacklisted Dalton Trumbo and who later found himself blacklisted
Ian Huntley, double murderer
Ian Jacobs (academic) (born 1957), English academic, gynaecological oncologist, gynaecologist/obstetrician
Ian Jacobs, Australian kickboxer and 3-time World Kickboxing Champion
Ian James (athlete) (born 1963), Olympic athlete
Ian James Corlett (born 1962), cartoon writer and voice actor
Ian Jones-Quartey (born 1984), animator
Ian Joyce (born 1985), American soccer player
Ian Kahn (born 1972), American actor
Ian Karmel (born 1984), American stand-up comedian and writer
Ian Kennedy (born 1984), Major League Baseball pitcher
Ian Kershaw (born 1943), historian
Ian Kochinski (born 1994), American YouTuber and livestreamer
Ian "Lemmy" Kilmister, singer/bass player in Motörhead
Ian Kinsler (born 1982), Israeli-American Major League Baseball All Star second baseman
Ian Krankie (born 1947), Scottish entertainer
Ian Laperrière (born 1974), hockey player
Ian Lavender (born 1946), English actor
Ian Law (born 1938), Australian footballer
Ian Levy, British Conservative MP for Blyth Valley since 2019
 Ian Hideo Levy (born 1950), American author
Ian Livingstone (born 1949), author
Ian Lorimer, television director
Ian Lucas (born 1960), politician
Ian MacArthur (1925–2007), politician
Ian MacDonald (1948–2003), author
Ian Macdonald QC (1939–2019)
Ian MacKaye (born 1962), musician
Ian Mahinmi (born 1986), basketball player
Ian Martin (disambiguation), multiple people
Ian Matos (1989–2021), Brazilian diver
Ian Matthews (drummer) (born 1971), drummer for Kasabian
Ian Maxtone-Graham (born 1959), television writer and producer
Ian McAteer (born 1961), former gangster from Glasgow
Ian McCaskill (1938–2016), weather forecaster
Ian McCulloch (actor) (born 1939), actor
Ian McCulloch (singer), singer in the band Echo & the Bunnymen
Ian McCulloch (snooker player) (born 1971), snooker player
Ian McDiarmid (born 1944), actor
Ian McDonald (musician), British musician, best known for being a member of both King Crimson and Foreigner
Ian McEwan (born 1948), English novelist and screenwriter
Ian McKay, recipient of the Victoria Cross
Sir Ian McKellen (born 1939), actor
Ian McLagan, English musician, best known for being a member of both Small Faces and Faces
Ian McMillan (footballer) (born 1931), Scottish footballer
Ian McMillan (poet) (born 1956), poet
Ian McShane (born 1942), actor
Ian Messiter, creator of Just a Minute
Ian Moran (cricketer) (born 1979), Australian cricketer
Ian Moran (born 1972), American hockey player
Ian Morris (footballer), Irish professional footballer
Ian Morrison (disambiguation), multiple people
Ian Morton (born 1970), English cricketer
Ian Mosley, drummer for Marillion
Ian Moss, Australian musician, Cold Chisel
Ian Murdock, computer professional, creator of the Debian project
Ian Nepomniachtchi (born 1990), Russian chess grandmaster
Ian O'Brien (born 1947), swimmer
Ian Oswald Liddell, recipient of the Victoria Cross
Ian Paice, drummer of Deep Purple
Ian Paisley (1926–2014), Protestant politician
Ian Patterson (born 1973), English footballer
Ian Pearson (badminton) (born 1974), English badminton player
Ian Peck (born 1957), English cricketer
Ian Pooley (born 1973), German DJ
Ian Poulter (born 1976), English professional golfer
Ian Punnett (born 1960), American radio broadcaster and priest
Ian Rankin (born 1960), Scottish novelist
Ian Reed, Australian discus thrower
Ian Reid (disambiguation), multiple people
Ian Richards (disambiguation), multiple people
Ian Richardson (1934–2007), Scottish actor
Ian Robinson (disambiguation), multiple people
Ian Ross (disambiguation), multiple people
Ian Rush (born 1961), Welsh international footballer
Ian Sanders (born 1961), cricketer for Edinburgh, Scotland
Ian Sangalang (born 1991), Filipino professional basketball player
Ian Scheckter, former South African F1 driver. Brother of Jody Scheckter and uncle of Tomas Scheckter.
Ian Scott (disambiguation), multiple people
Ian Smith (disambiguation), multiple people
Ian Smith (1919–2007), former Rhodesian Prime Minister
Ian Snell, Major League Baseball pitcher
Ian Somerhalder (born 1978), actor
Ian Stanley (born 1957), British musician
Ian Stannard (born 1987), English cyclist
Ian Stevenson Webster (1925–2002), British judge
Ian Stewart (disambiguation), multiple people
Ian Stone, comedian
Ian Svenonius, American musician
Ian Thomas (American football) (born 1995), American football player
Ian Thomson (disambiguation), multiple people
Ian Thornley (born 1972), Canadian musician
Ian Thorpe (born 1982), Australian swimmer
Ian "Sam" Totman (born 1979), British guitarist
Ian Tyson (1933–2022), Canadian singer-songwriter
Ian Van Dahl, Belgian artist
Ian Veneracion, Filipino actor, athlete, pilot, and singer
Ian Walker (sailor) (born 1970), British sailor
Ian Waltz (born 1977), American discus thrower
Ian Watkins (Lostprophets singer) (born 1977), former lead singer of the alternative metal band Lostprophets, and convicted pedophile
Ian H Watkins (born 1976), British pop singer and actor, former member of Steps
Ian Weatherhead (born 1932), English watercolor artist
Ian Webster (born 1986), English footballer
Ian West (born 1951), Australian politician
Ian Willoughby Bazalgette, recipient of the Victoria Cross
Ian Wilmut, English embryologist, best known for cloning Dolly the sheep
Ian Wilson (disambiguation), multiple people
Ian Wolfe, American actor
Ian Wood (disambiguation), multiple people
Ian Woosnam (born 1958), Welsh golfer
Ian Wright (born 1963), footballer
Ian Donald Calvin Euclid Zappa (born 1969), birth name of American musician Dweezil Zappa
Ian Ziering (born 1964), actor

As a middle name
Michael Ian Black (often credited by his full name, born 1971), American comedian
Richard Ian Cox (born 1973), Welsh-Canadian actor, voice actor, and radio host
Thomas Ian Nicholas (born 1980), Actor and singer
Henry Ian Cusick (born 1967), Scottish-Peruvian actor and television director

As a surname
Janis Ian (born 1951), singer and songwriter
Scott Ian, stage name of Scott Ian Rosenfeld, guitarist with the metal band Anthrax

Notable people named Iain
Iain Anders (1933–1997), English actor 
Iain Andrews (born 1975), contemporary English painter
Iain Archer, Northern Irish Singer-songwriter musician
Iain Armitage (born 2008), American child actor
Iain Baird (born 1971), Canadian former soccer defender 
Iain Ballamy (born 1964), British composer, soprano, alto and tenor saxophone player
Iain Balshaw (born 1979), MBE, English rugby player
Iain Bell (born 1980), English composer 
Iain Banks (1954–2013), Scottish writer
Iain Benson (born 1955), legal philosopher, writer, professor and practising legal consultant
Iain Black (born 1967), British Columbia politician
Iain Boal, Irish social historian of technics and the commons
Iain Borden (born 1962), English architectural historian and urban commentator
Iain Brambell (born 1973), Canadian rower
Iain Brines (born 1967), former Scottish football referee in the Scottish Premier League
Iain Brunnschweiler (born 1979), English former cricketer
Iain Canning (born 1979), English film producer 
Iain Chambers, English composer, producer and performer
Iain Cheeseman, Australian scientist
Iain Chisholm (born 1985), Scottish footballer
Iain Clough (born 1965), British slalom canoer 
Iain Collings, Australian scientist
Iain Connell (born 1977), Scottish comedian and actor
Iain Coucher (born 1961), British businessman and consultant in the railway industry
Iain Couzin, British scientist
Iain Dale (born 1962), British broadcaster, author and political commentator
Iain Davidson (born 1984), Scottish professional footballer
Iain De Caestecker (born 1987), Scottish actor
Iain Dilthey (born 1971), British film director
Iain Donald Campbell (1941–2014), FRS (1941 – 2014) Scottish biophysicist and academic
Iain Dowie (born 1965), Northern Irish football manager
Iain Duncan (born 1963), Canadian former ice hockey forward
Iain Dunn (born 1970), English former professional footballer
Iain Durrant (born 1966), Scottish footballer
Iain Eairdsidh MacAsgaill (1898—1934), Scottish poet and piper
Iain Evans (field hockey) (born 1981), South African field hockey player
Iain Fairley (born 1973), Scottish rugby union player 
Iain Fearn (born 1949), Scottish footballer
Iain Finlay (born 1935)
Iain Finlayson (alpine skier) (1951–1990), British alpine skier
Iain Glen (born 1961), Scottish actor, noted for his role in TV's Game of Thrones
Iain Gray (born 1957), Leader of Labour in the Scottish Parliament
Iain Harnden (born 1976), Zimbabwean hurdler
Iain Kay (born 1949), Zimbabwean farmer and politician
Iain Lee (born 1973), British comedian, TV presenter and radio presenter
Iain Lindsay (born 1959), British diplomat
Iain Macleod (1913–1970), British politician
Iain Macmillan (1938–2006), Scottish photographer, noted for his image of the Beatles walking across Abbey Road
Iain Matthews (born 1946), formerly known as Ian Matthews, English musician, singer-songwriter, member of Fairport Convention
 Iain David McGeachy (1948–2009), birth name of John Martyn, British singer-songwriter and guitarist
Iain McGilchrist (born 1953), psychiatrist, writer, and former Oxford literary scholar
Iain McKenzie (born 1959), Scottish politician
Iain O'Brien (born 1976), New Zealand cricketer
Iain Paxton (born 1957), Scottish rugby player
Iain Robertson (born 1981), Scottish actor
Iain Smith (Scottish politician) (born 1960), Scottish politician
Iain Duncan Smith (born 1954), Leader of the Conservative Party, 2001–2003
Iain Softley (born 1958), film director
Iain Stirling (born 1988), Scottish TV presenter and comedian
Iain Stewart (disambiguation), multiple people
 Iain Sutherland (1948–2019), Scottish musician, member of The Sutherland Brothers
Iain Sydie (born 1969), Canadian badminton player
Iain Torrance (born 1949), President of Princeton Theological Seminary and former Moderator of the General Assembly of the Church of Scotland

Fictional people named Ian

 Ian – the supporting character from Shinbi's Haunted House anime
 Ian – from Shane Jiraiya Cummings' short story "Ian"; every male character the protagonist meets is called Ian
 Ian – from Sarah Kane's play Blasted
 Ian – from Leprechaun 2
 Ian – the protagonist in the manga Not Simple by Natsume Ono
Ian Beale – from the TV soap opera EastEnders
Ian Chesterton – from the TV series Doctor Who
 Ian Craig – from the radio soap opera The Archers
 Ian the Deer – Elliot's arch-rival in the Open Season movies
 Ian Doyle – an Irish terrorist featured on Criminal Minds 
Ian Edgerton – FBI agent and sniper from the show Numb3rs
Ian Foot – from the British TV series Come Fly with Me
Ian Gallagher – one of the main characters in the television drama Shameless
 Ian Hainsworth – Susan Delfino's boyfriend in 3rd season of Desperate Housewives
Ian Hawke – the main antagonist in the Alvin and the Chipmunks movies
 Ian Howe – an antagonist in National Treasure
 Ian Kabra – antagonist of the book series The 39 Clues
 Ian Kelley – title character from the Canadian animated series Being Ian
 Ian Lewis and Ian Ketterman (together with dozens of other Ians) – characters created by Lee and Herring; the duo used 'Ian' as their de facto comedy name, in such sketches as the Ian News
 Ian Lightfoot – Tom Holland’s character from the film Onward
Ian Malcolm – from Michael Crichton's novel Jurassic Park
Ian (MÄR) – a recurring character in the manga and anime series MÄR
 Ian Maxtone-Graham – from the TV series Suddenly Susan
 Professor Ian McClaine – adoptive father of Joe 90
 Ian McKenzie – the liberal attorney from the novel and the film A Dry White Season
 Ian McKinley – from the movie Final Destination 3
 Ian Miller – from the movie My Big Fat Greek Wedding
 Ian Murray – the nephew of Jamie Fraser in Diana Gabaldon's Outlander series
 Ian Nottingham – a character from Witchblade comic and TV series
 Ian O'Shea – from Stephenie Meyer's novel The Host
 Ian Papov – character and member of the Demolition Boys (also known as the Blitzkrieg Boys) from the anime series Beyblade (2000)
 Ian Randall – from the Smallville (TV series), episodes "Dichotic" and "Asylum", a character who had the ability to duplicate himself
 Ian Raymond – Laura's boyfriend in the novel and film High Fidelity
 Ian Rider – from the Alex Rider books
Ian Schulenburg – unseen husband of Harriet Schulenburg in Green Wing
 Ian Scuffling – Tyrone Slothrup's adopted name after he goes into hiding in Thomas Pynchon's Gravity's Rainbow
Ian Slater – from the ABC soap opera All My Children
 Ian Thomas – Ryan Merriman's character in the TV series Pretty Little Liars
Janis Ian – from the film Mean Girls

Fictional people named Iain
 Iain Sterling, a fictional character in the Android: Netrunner universe
Iain Dean, a fictional character in the Casualty Central universe

See also
John (given name), a common masculine given name in the English language of originally Semitic origin
Eoin
Ioan
Ian (disambiguation)
IANS (disambiguation)

References

English-language masculine given names
Scottish masculine given names
English masculine given names
Masculine given names
Irish masculine given names
Welsh masculine given names